Walter Schultze (1 January 189416 August 1979) was a German physician and Reichsdozentenführer (Reich Leader of University Teachers) in Nazi Germany between 1935 and 1943.

Early life and career
Schultze was born on 1 January 1894 in Hersbruck in the German Empire. Schultze was an aviator in the First World War. Thereafter he served in the Freikorps under the command of Franz Ritter von Epp. Schultze had been involved in the Nazi Party since its founding in 1919. He was involved in the Munich Beer Hall Putsch in 1923, organising the getaway car. He was appointed head SA doctor in 1923. Later, Schultze moved into politics, serving as a deputy of the Bavarian parliament between 1926 and 1931. In November 1933, Schultze became Director of the Bavarian Ministry of Justice and head of the Public Health Department of the Ministry of the Interior.

Two years later, Schultze began the role for which he was best known, as Reich Leader of University Teachers. During his tenure, Schultze played a key part in implementing Nazi racial policies, asserting that the success of German universities depended on having "the type of the combat-ready political, National Socialist fighters who regard their 'Volk' as the supreme good".  Schultze was Reichsdozentenführer until 1943.

Schultze was also involved in the T-4 Euthanasia Program. At least 380 cases of aiding and abetting the killing of disabled people were traced to him. In 1960, he was sentenced to four years' imprisonment. Schultze died on 16 August 1979 in Krailling, near Munich.

References

Bibliography
Zenter, Christian and Bedürftig, Friedemann (1991). Encyclopedia of the Third Reich, p. 848. New York: Macmillan. 

1894 births
1979 deaths
Holocaust perpetrators in Germany
Aktion T4 personnel
Sturmabteilung personnel
20th-century Freikorps personnel
People from Hersbruck
Nazis convicted of crimes